Tizanidine, sold under the brand name Zanaflex among others, is an alpha-2 (α2) adrenergic receptor agonist, similar to clonidine, that is used to treat muscle spasticity due to spinal cord injury, multiple sclerosis, and spastic cerebral palsy. Effectiveness appears similar to baclofen or diazepam. It is taken by mouth.

Common side effects of tizanidine include dry mouth, sleepiness, weakness, and dizziness. Serious side effects may include low blood pressure, liver problems, psychosis, and QT prolongation. It is unclear if use in pregnancy and breastfeeding is safe. It is an α2-adrenergic agonist, but how it works is not entirely clear.

Tizanidine was approved for medical use in the United States in 1996. It is available as a generic medication. In 2020, it was the 84th most commonly prescribed medication in the United States, with more than 8million prescriptions.

Medical uses
Tizanidine has been found to be as effective as other antispasmodic drugs and is more tolerable than baclofen and diazepam.

Side effects 
Side effects include dizziness, drowsiness, weakness, nervousness, confusion, hallucinations, strange dreams, depression, vomiting, dry mouth, constipation, diarrhea, stomach pain, heartburn, increased muscle spasms, back pain, rash, sweating, and a tingling sensation in the arms, legs, hands, and feet.

Interactions 
Concomitant use of tizanidine and moderate or potent CYP1A2 inhibitors (such as zileuton, certain antiarrhythmics (amiodarone, mexiletine, propafenone, verapamil), cimetidine, famotidine, aciclovir, ticlopidine and oral contraceptives) is contraindicated. Concomitant use of tizanidine with fluvoxamine, a potent CYP1A2 inhibitor in humans, resulted in a 33-fold increase in the tizanidine AUC (plasma drug concentration-time curve). For this reason both fluvoxamine and tizanidine should not be taken at the same time. Fluoroquinolone antibiotics such as moxifloxacin, levofloxacin, and ciprofloxacin should also be avoided due to an increased serum concentration of tizanidine when administered concomitantly. Tizanidine has the potential to interact with other central nervous system depressants. Alcohol should be avoided, particularly as it can upset the stomach. The CNS-depressant effects of tizanidine and alcohol are additive. Caution with the following interactions:

 antibiotics such as enoxacin, gatifloxacin, levofloxacin, lomefloxacin, moxifloxacin, ofloxacin, sparfloxacin, trovafloxacin, or norfloxacin;
 blood pressure medications such as clonidine, guanabenz, guanfacine (Tenex), or methyldopa;
 heart rhythm medications such as amiodarone (Cordarone, Pacerone), mexiletine (Mexitil), propafenone (Rhythmol), and verapamil (Calan, Covera, Isoptin).

Pharmacology 
Tizanidine is an α2 receptor agonist closely related to clonidine. It has  approximately one tenth to one fifteenth of the pressure lowering effect of clonidine. The relation between the α2 receptor agonism and the spasmolytic action is still not fully understood.

Route of administration
Tizanidine is available as a tablet or capsule. Capsules may be opened and sprinkled on food. However, this may change the absorption of the medication compared to taking the capsule whole. It has a volume of distribution of 2.4 L/kg following intravenous administration.

Chemistry
Tizanidine is a derivative of 2,1,3-benzothiadiazole and its first published synthesis was reported in a patent. The 5-chloro-2,1,3-benzothiadiazol-4-amine intermediate was a known compound, produced in three steps from 4-chlorophenylenediamine as shown. Treatment with two equivalents of thionyl chloride in pyridine formed the heterocycle, which was nitrated with sodium nitrate in sulfuric acid and reduced using iron and acetic acid.

The amine intermediate was treated with benzoyl chloride and ammonium thiocyanate followed by alkaline hydrolysis to form a thiourea. This was activated as its isothiuronium salt before being treated with ethylene diamine to give tizanidine.

References

External links 
 
 
 

Muscle relaxants
Alpha-2 adrenergic receptor agonists
Imidazolines
Novartis brands
Organochlorides
Benzothiadiazoles
Wikipedia medicine articles ready to translate